G2000 may refer to:
 G2000, a clothing brand
 CZ-G2000, a handgun created by Arms Moravia
 Vossloh G2000, a diesel locomotive
 Garmin G2000 avionics system